Wilhelm "Willy" Schärer (20 September 1903 – 26 November 1982) was a Swiss middle-distance runner who won a silver medal over 1500 m at the Olympic Games in Paris in 1924. The race was won by Paavo Nurmi.

References

External links
Biography of Willy Schärer 

Swiss male middle-distance runners
Athletes (track and field) at the 1924 Summer Olympics
Olympic athletes of Switzerland
1903 births
1982 deaths
Medalists at the 1924 Summer Olympics
Olympic silver medalists for Switzerland
Olympic silver medalists in athletics (track and field)